Anne Thompson is a visual artist and Director and Curator of the Suzanne Lemberg Usdan Gallery at Bennington College. Thompson is the founder of the I-70 Sign Show project, using highway billboards as an artistic medium. She received an MFA from the Yale School of Art in 2002  and taught at the University of Missouri from 2006 to 2017 before becoming a faculty member at Bennington. She is represented by Hudson Franklin gallery in New York City.

References

External links
 Anne Thompson on oneartworld.com
 Further information and images at Hudson Franklin Gallery
 Thompson's Central Collective website

American artists
University of Missouri faculty
Year of birth missing (living people)
Living people
Yale University alumni